Homophoberia apicosa, the black wedge-spot, is an owlet moth (family Noctuidae). The species was first described by Adrian Hardy Haworth in 1809.

The MONA or Hodges number for Homophoberia apicosa is 9057.

References

Further reading

External links
 

Condicinae
Articles created by Qbugbot
Moths described in 1809